Article 134 of the Uniform Code of Military Justice (UCMJ) also known as the General Article of the UCMJ is an article of military law in the United States that provides for penalties by court-martial various offences that prejudice good order and discipline or bring discredit upon the armed forces, such as for "disloyal" statements made "with the intent to promote disloyalty or disaffection toward the United States by any member of the armed forces or to interfere with or impair the loyalty to the United States or good order and discipline of any member of the armed forces."

Manual for Courts-Martial

See also
 Uniform Code of Military Justice
 General article (UCMJ article 134)

External links
 About.com article
 Kuro5hin.org article

United States military law